The 1977 Australian Sports Sedan Championship was a CAMS sanctioned national motor racing title for drivers of Sports Sedans complying with Group B regulations.

The championship was contested over a seven-round series. 
 Round 1, Oran Park, New South Wales, 1 May
 Round 2, Surfers Paradise, Queensland, 15 May
 Round 3, Wanneroo Park, Western Australia, 12 June
 Round 4, Sandown Park, Victoria, 3 July
 Round 5, Calder Raceway, Victoria, 7 August
 Round 6, Adelaide International Raceway, South Australia, 21 August
 Round 7, Symmons Plains, Tasmania, 18 September
Round 1 was conducted as a single race and all other rounds were contested over two heats.

Championship points were awarded on a 9–6–4–3–2–1 basis to the top six placegetters in each round.
Only the best six round results for each driver were counted.
Where rounds were run over two heats, results were determined by awarding round points on a 20–16–13–11–10–9–8–7–6–5–4–3–2–1 basis to the top fourteen placegetters in each heat.
Where round points were tied, the relevant round placing was awarded to the driver attaining the higher position in the second heat.

Results

References

Further reading

 Australian Competition Yearbook, 1978
 Chequered Flag, August 1977, pp. 19–20 (Sandown round report)
 Official Programme, Adelaide International Raceway, 14 August 1977
 The Australian Racing History of Ford, 1989
 The Mercury, Monday, 19 September 1997, p. 19 (Symmons round report)
 The Official Racing History of Holden, 1988

External links
 CAMS Manual of Motor Sport, Records, Titles & Awards
 Autopics 1977 images, including Sports Sedans

National Sports Sedan Series
Sports Sedan Championship